The individual dressage at the 2007 FEI European Dressage Championships in Turin, Italy was held at La Mandria from 30 August to September 2, 2007.

The Netherlands's Anky van Grunsven won the gold medal in the Grand Prix Freestyle. Isabell Werth representing Germany won a golden medal the Grand Prix Special and silver in the Grand Prix Freestyle. Imke Schellekens-Bartels of The Netherlands won a bronze in the Special and in the Freestyle. In the Grand Prix The Netherlands won the golden team medal, while the Great Britain won the silver medal and Germany bronze.

Competition format

The team and individual dressage competitions used the same results. Dressage had three phases. The first phase was the Grand Prix. Top 30 individuals advanced to the second phase, the Grand Prix Special where the first individual medals were awarded. The last set of medals at the 2007 European Dressage Championships was awarded after the third phase, the Grand Prix Freestyle where top 15 combinations competed, with a maximum of the three best riders per country.

Judges
The following judges were appointed to officiate during the European Dressage Championships.

  Vincenzo Truppa (Ground Jury President)
  Isabelle Judet (Ground Jury Member)
  Evi Eisenhardt (Ground Jury Member)
  Wim Ernes (Ground Jury Member)
  Gary Rockwell (Ground Jury Member)
  Beatrice Bürchler-Keller (Ground Jury Member)
  Leif Törnblad (Ground Jury Member)
  Gotthilf Riexinger (Technical Delegate)

Schedule

All times are Central European Summer Time (UTC+1)

Results

References

2007 in equestrian